Bohang Moeko (born 13 April 1988), is a South African actor. He is best known for the roles in the films and television serials: Seriously Single, The Hot Zone and Housekeepers.

Personal life
He was born on 13 April 1988 in Protea North, Soweto. His father worked in construction. He graduated with an honors degree in quantity surveying at the University of the Free State. after graduation, he moved to Durban and settled and worked for two years.

He started dating Shantal Dietrich, a fitness coach since 2018. They got engaged in July 2020.

Career
He moved to Johannesburg to study acting. During this period, he made his first act on Zabalaza in 2013 with the role 'Victor'. Since then, he acted in many films and television serials such as Ring of Lies, Side Dish, Isithunzi, Housekeepers, Scandal, Isidingo, The Hot Zone, and The Queen. Meanwhile, he moved to modeling career where he became a finalist in the 2013 Mr South Africa competition.

He also appeared on #Karektas as 'Celebrity Guest' and then on Housekeepers as 'Kabelo' in 2018. In 2019, he made his first international role in a short series The Hot Zone. In August 2020, he starred in the sex comedy film Seriously Single co-directed by Katleho Ramaphakela and Rethabile Ramaphakela. It was released on July 31, 2020 on Netflix.

Partial filmography

References

External links
 

Living people
South African male film actors
South African male television actors
1988 births
People from Soweto
University of the Free State alumni
21st-century South African actors